A glidant is a substance that is added to a powder to improve its flowability. A glidant will only work at a certain range of concentrations. Above a certain concentration, the glidant will in fact function to inhibit flowability.

In tablet manufacture, glidants are usually added just prior to compression.

Examples
Examples of glidants include ascorbyl palmitate, calcium palmitate, magnesium stearate, fumed silica (colloidal silicon dioxide), starch and talc.

Mechanism of action
A glidant's effect is due to the counter-action of factors that cause poor flowability of powders. For instance, correcting surface irregularity, reducing interparticular friction and decreasing surface charge. The result is a decrease in the angle of repose which is an indication of an enhanced powder's flowability

References

Granularity of materials